Lucas Legnani (born November 10, 1978 in Buenos Aires, Argentina) is an Argentine ten-pin bowler. He finished in 14th position of the combined rankings at the 2006 AMF World Cup. He was also a bronze medalist at the 2007 Pan American Games in Rio de Janeiro, Brazil.

References

Living people
Argentine ten-pin bowling players
Bowlers at the 2007 Pan American Games
Pan American Games bronze medalists for Argentina
Place of birth missing (living people)
1978 births
Pan American Games medalists in bowling
South American Games bronze medalists for Argentina
South American Games medalists in bowling
Competitors at the 2018 South American Games
Bowlers at the 2019 Pan American Games
Medalists at the 2007 Pan American Games